Vatica maingayi is a species of plant in the family Dipterocarpaceae. It is a tree found in Sumatra, Peninsular Malaysia, Singapore and Borneo. It is a Critically endangered species threatened by habitat loss.

References

External links
 

maingayi
Trees of Sumatra
Trees of Malaya
Trees of Borneo
Critically endangered flora of Asia
Taxonomy articles created by Polbot